Verdun (also known as Verdun—Saint-Paul, Verdun—Saint-Henri and Verdun—Saint-Henri—Saint-Paul—Pointe-Saint-Charles) was a federal electoral district in Quebec, Canada, that was represented in the House of Commons of Canada from 1935 to 1949 and from 1953 to 2004.

Verdun—La Salle riding, which covered much of the same area, was represented in the House of Commons from 1949 to 1953.

History

The riding was created as "Verdun" riding in 1933 from parts of Jacques Cartier and St. Anne ridings. It was abolished in 1947 when it was redistributed into Jacques Cartier and "Verdun—La Salle" ridings.

Verdun—La Salle riding was created from Verdun riding in 1947, and was abolished in 1952 when it was redistributed into a new Verdun riding and into Jacques-Cartier—Lasalle.

"Verdun" riding was recreated in 1952 from parts of Verdun—La Salle riding. It was renamed "Verdun—Saint-Paul" in 1980, "Verdun—Saint-Henri" in 1996, and "Verdun—Saint-Henri—Saint-Paul—Pointe Saint-Charles" in 2000.

In 2004, the riding was merged into Jeanne-Le Ber riding.

Members of Parliament
This riding elected the following Members of Parliament:

Election results

Verdun 1933-1947

Verdun—La Salle 1947-1952

Verdun 1952-1980

Verdun—Saint-Paul 1981-1997

Verdun—Saint-Henri 1997-2000

Verdun—Saint-Henri—Saint-Paul—Pointe Saint-Charles 2000-2004

See also 

 List of Canadian federal electoral districts
 Past Canadian electoral districts

External links
Riding history from the Library of Parliament:
Verdun 1935-1947
Verdun—La Salle 1947-1952
Verdun 1952-1980
Verdun—Saint-Paul 1981-1997
Verdun—Saint-Henri 1997-2000
Verdun—Saint-Henri—Saint-Paul—Pointe Saint-Charles 2000-2004

Former federal electoral districts of Quebec
Verdun, Quebec